Maʾmūn al-Ḥaqq ibn ʿAzīz al-Ḥaqq ibn Irshād ʿAlī ad-Dākawī (born November 1973), or simply Mamunul Haque, is a Bangladeshi Deobandi Islamic scholar, politician, academic, writer, editor, and social reformer. He is the former Joint Secretary General of Hefazat-e-Islam Bangladesh, Secretary General of Bangladesh Khelafat Majlish, Shaykh al-Hadith of Jamia Rahmania Arabia Dhaka, Founder of Babri Mosque Bangladesh, Editor-in-Chief of Monthly Rahmani Paigam, President of Bangladesh Khelafat Youth Majlish and Khatib at Baitul Mamur Jame Mosque. He is also a leading figure in several organizations, including Rabetatul Waizin Bangladesh, an organization of Islamic speakers in Bangladesh. He is particularly popular with the hard-line speaks against atheists, secularists, anti-islamist and was arrested for leading the movement in this regard. 65 organizations including Bangladesh Awami League, Chhatra League, Jubo League have started a massive movement across the country demanding banning, arrest and exemplary punishment of him for promoting Islamic fundamentalism. In 2021, his second wife accused him of raping her.

Early life and family 
Mamunul Haque was born in November 1973, in Azimpur, Dhaka. He belongs to a Bengali Muslim family of Qadis originally from the village of Bhirich Khan, in Louhajang, Munshiganj. His father Azizul Haque, was the founder of the Bangladesh Khelafat Majlish and first Bengali translator of Sahih al-Bukhari. He has 13 brothers and sisters. Mahfuzul Haque is his eldest brother, a prominent Islamic scholar in Bangladesh.

Career 
On 10 October 2020, he was elected Secretary General of Bangladesh Khelafat Majlish and on 15 November, Joint-Secretary General of Hefazat-e-Islam Bangladesh.

On 29 September 2019, he was elected as an advisor to Rabetatul Waizin Bangladesh, an organization of Islamic speakers in Bangladesh. In February 2020, he started the construction of Babri Mosque Bangladesh in Dhaka.

Family 
According to Haque, he has married thrice but only with his marriage with, Amina Tayyiba, is certified. According to him, his other two wives are Jannat Ara Jharna and Jannatul Ferdous Lipi. However Jharna has charged him with rape and detention and stated that they are not married.

Arrest 
He was arrested by the Bangladesh government on 12 May 2013 for leading the Hefazat Movement held at Shapla Square in Dhaka on 5 and 6 May 2013. During this time he wrote a book, Speaking From Prison, which was published in September of that year.

Publications 
He has published ten books and edited four. Since 2001, he has been editor of the magazine Montly Rahmani Paygame. He also writes articles on contemporary issues in national and daily newspapers.

Books:

 Speaking from prison (2013)
 Time message
 Speaking of arches and pulpits
 The role of Alem Society in the freedom struggle
 Struggle in the way of truth
 Women's rights: interpretation and elimination of misconceptions
 Pahela Boishakh: What does Islam say?
 The identity of a successful believer
 A religious invitation
 Caliphate state system: introduction and policy
 I want lively workers in the Islamic movement
 Leadership and loyalty in Islamic organizations
 Leadership, loyalty and Islamic life
 What is the Islamic organization and why?

References 

1973 births
Bangladeshi editors
Bangladeshi Islamic religious leaders
Bangladeshi Sunni Muslim scholars of Islam
Bengali Muslim scholars of Islam
Deobandis
Hanafis
Living people
People from Munshiganj District
21st-century Bangladeshi politicians
20th-century Muslim scholars of Islam
21st-century Bangladeshi writers
20th-century Bengalis
21st-century Bengalis